The 1987–88 Lancashire Cup was the seventy-fifth occasion on which the Lancashire Cup competition had been held. It was contested during the 1987–88 Rugby Football League season by clubs in Lancashire. Wigan won the trophy by beating Warrington in the final.

Results  
This season the total number of entrants remained at the 16 level. With this full sixteen members there was no need for “blank” or “dummy” fixtures or any byes.

Round 1 
Round 1 involved 8 matches (with no byes) and 16 clubs.

Round 2 - Quarter-finals 
Round 2 involved 4 matches and 8 clubs.

Round 3 – Semi-finals  
Round 3 involved 2 matches and 4 clubs

Final 
The final was contested by Wigan and Warrington, with Wigan winning by the score of 28-16. The match was played at Knowsley Road, Eccleston, St Helens, Merseyside, (historically in the county of Lancashire). The attendance was 20,237 and receipts were £67,339. This was Wigan’s fourth appearance in four years and a third victory in what would be a run of four victories and five appearances in five successive years. The attendance was again at a very pleasing level, the fourth  of the five year period when it would reach around the 20,000 level, and the receipts reached a new record level exceeding the previous record by almost £7,000.

Teams and scorers 

Scoring - Try = four points - Goal = two points - Drop goal = one point

Pathway to the final

Notes 
1 * The first Lancashire Cup match played by the newly named/formed club, Springfield Borough
2 * The attendance is given as 20,234 in the RUGBYLEAGUEproject  data, and as 20,237 in the Rothmans Rugby League Yearbook 1991-1992. The Wigan official archives give 20,234 in the results details, and 20,237 in the game details
3 * Knowsley Road was the home ground of St. Helens from 1890 to 2010. The final capacity was in the region of 18,000, although the actual record attendance was 35,695, set on 26 December 1949, for a league game between St Helens and Wigan
4 * The Rothmans Rugby League Yearbook 1991-1992 shows  the Wigan number 2 position occupied by Richard Russell   - The official Wigan archives show the number 2 position as Richard Marshall

See also 
Rugby league county cups

References

External links
Saints Heritage Society
1896–97 Northern Rugby Football Union season at wigan.rlfans.com 
Hull&Proud Fixtures & Results 1896/1897
Widnes Vikings - One team, one passion Season In Review - 1896-97
The Northern Union at warringtonwolves.org

RFL Lancashire Cup
Lancashire Cup